James 'Kimo' Wills (born October 2, 1975, in Houston, Texas, USA) is an American actor. He is perhaps best remembered for his role as stoned pizza guy "Eddie" in 1995's Empire Records.

Wills had several small roles in the 1990s, often playing the role of a young "stoner dude". Many of Wills' roles, such as 1993's Dazed & Confused, were uncredited.

Partial filmography 
Onion Skin (1993) (short film)
Dazed & Confused (1993)
Empire Records (1995)
Lush (1999)
The Tao of Steve (2000)
White Oleander (2002)

External links
 

1975 births
Living people
Male actors from Houston
American male film actors